Following is a list of justices of the Wyoming Supreme Court.

Justices of the Wyoming Territorial Supreme Court

Justices of the Wyoming State Supreme Court

References

Wyoming
Justices